The Shadow is an unreleased Russian drama film directed by Dmitriy Svetozarov. It stars Mikhail Porechenkov and Yuriy Stoyanov. It was scheduled to be released on 6 July 2017.

Plot
Film will tell about a man who fell in love with a photo of a long-dead beautiful actress of silent cinema.

Cast
 Mikhail Porechenkov as Boris Gordin
 Yuriy Stoyanov as Panov
 Pavel Chernyavskiy as Dvornik / Frolov
 Pyotr Logachev
 Evgeniy Kataev as Pronin
 Sergey Vasilev
 Varvara Shcherbakova as Veronika

References

External links 

Unreleased films
Russian drama films